Lukovitsy is a village in Leninsky District of Tula Oblast, Russia. In the 18th century it was part of the Alexinsky district. The village church of the Nativity of the Blessed Virgin Mary was built.

References

Rural localities in Tula Oblast